Bembecia psoraleae is a moth of the family Sesiidae. It is found in France, Spain, Portugal and Italy.

The wingspan is about 24 mm.

The larvae feed on the roots of Psoralea bituminosa.

References

Moths described in 1997
Sesiidae
Moths of Europe